San Francisco and North Pacific Railroad (SF&NP) provided the first extensive standard gauge rail service to Sonoma County and became the southern end of the regional Northwestern Pacific Railroad.  Although first conceived of by Asbury Harpending, who had even obtained many of the right of ways, the SF & NP was bought and subsequently constructed by Peter Donahue, who drove the first spike on August 30, 1869.

Sonoma County's first standard-gauge railroad, operated by the Sonoma County Railroad Company, was the 1-mile (1.6-km) Petaluma and Haystack Railroad connecting the city of Petaluma with ferry service to San Francisco from Haystack Landing on the Petaluma River in 1864.  Petaluma and Haystack coaches were pulled by horses after the locomotive exploded on 27 August 1866.

SF&NP began construction from Petaluma northward in 1869, but inability to make satisfactory arrangements with the City of Petaluma caused the railroad to establish a new southern ferry terminus on the Petaluma River at Donahue Landing.  Service was extended north to Santa Rosa in 1870, and Cloverdale in 1872.  The Fulton and Guerneville Railroad was formed in 1874 to build a SF&NP branch from Fulton to Guerneville on the Russian River.  The branch was completed in 1877.

In 1879, the SF&NP was extended south through Petaluma to San Rafael in Marin County.  The San Francisco and San Rafael Railroad was formed in 1882 to extend the SF&NP south another  to a new ferry landing in Tiburon.  SF&NP ferry terminal facilities were moved to Tiburon in 1884; and Donahue Landing faded into the rural countryside.

The Cloverdale and Ukiah Railroad was formed in 1886 to extend the SF&NP north to Ukiah in Mendocino County.  Service began to Ukiah in 1889.  The Santa Rosa, Sebastopol and Green Valley Railroad was formed in 1889 to build a SF&NP branch from Santa Rosa to Sebastopol.  The branch was completed in 1890.

The California Northwestern Railway Company was formed in 1898 as part of Southern Pacific Railroad ambitions to reach the redwood lumber mills around Humboldt Bay.  SF&NP struggled through the panic of 1893, and was leased by the California Northwestern in 1898.  California Northwestern oversaw eastward connections to the Southern Pacific Railroad and northward extension to Willits before merger into the Northwestern Pacific Railroad in 1907.

Locomotives

Sources

Defunct California railroads
History of Sonoma County, California
History of the San Francisco Bay Area
History of Marin County, California
Transportation in Mendocino County, California
Transportation in Marin County, California
Transportation in Sonoma County, California
Predecessors of the Northwestern Pacific Railroad
Railway companies established in 1869
Railway companies disestablished in 1889
Railway stations on the National Register of Historic Places in California
National Register of Historic Places in Marin County, California
1869 establishments in California